Gajanan Gopinath Raikar (27 May 1935 – 24 September 2021) was an Indian politician, poet, writer, educator, journalist and freedom fighter from Goa. He was a former member of the Goa Legislative Assembly, representing the Ponda Assembly constituency from 1963 to 1967.

References

1935 births
2021 deaths
Indian politicians
Goa, Daman and Diu MLAs 1963–1967
People from North Goa district
20th-century Indian politicians
Maharashtrawadi Gomantak Party politicians